The Joint Entrance Examination (JEE) is an engineering entrance assessment conducted for admission to various engineering colleges in India. It is constituted by two different examinations: the JEE-Main and the JEE-Advanced.

The Joint Seat Allocation Authority (JoSAA) conducts the joint admission process for a total of 23 Indian Institutes of Technology, 31 National Institutes of Technology, 25 Indian Institutes of Information Technology campuses and other Government Funded Technical Institutes (GFTIs) based on the rank obtained by a student in JEE-Main or JEE-Advanced, depending on the engineering college.

There are some institutes, such as the Indian Institutes of Science Education and Research (IISERs), the Indian Institute of Petroleum and Energy (IIPE), the Rajiv Gandhi Institute of Petroleum Technology (RGIPT), the Indian Institute of Space Science and Technology (IIST), and the Indian Institute of Science (IISc), which use the score obtained in the JEE-Advanced examination as the basis for admission, but are not a part of the Joint Seat Allocation Authority (JoSAA) counselling process. Any student who takes admission to an Indian Institute of Technology cannot appear for the JEE-Advanced examination again, but the same is not the case with NIT, IISc, IISERs, RGIPT, IIPE, and IIST.

JEE-Main

JEE-Main is conducted by National Testing Agency (NTA). JEE-Main has two papers, Paper-I and Paper-II. Candidates may opt for either or both of them. Both papers contain multiple choice questions. Paper-I is for admission to B.E./B.Tech courses and is conducted in a Computer Based Test mode. Paper-II is for admission in B.Arch and B.Planning courses and will also be conducted in Computer Based Test mode except for one paper, namely the 'Drawing Test' which shall be conducted in Pen and Paper mode or offline mode. From January 2020 onwards, an additional Paper-III is being introduced for B.Planning courses separately.

Due to the COVID-19 pandemic in 2020, JEE-Main 2021 has a change in paper format and number of attempts. Now there will be 20 single choice questions and 10 numerical questions out of which only five numerical questions are to be attempted. The marking scheme is same as earlier i.e. for SCQs, +4 marks for correct answer and -1 marks for incorrect answer and 0 marks for not answered, and for numerical type questions, +4 marks for correct and 0 for incorrect.

JEE-Main, unlike JEE-Advanced, has a fixed exam structure and is not subject to change every year. Up until 2018, the JEE-Main Paper-I is of three hours duration and consists of thirty single choice questions in each of the three subjects (physics, chemistry and maths). 4 marks are awarded for correct answers and 1 mark is deducted for incorrect answers. Students taking this exam are usually in the age group 18-20.

A new pattern consisting of 20+5 questions per subject was introduced in January 2020 with 20 single choice questions + 5 numerical type questions by NTA. In single-choice questions 4 marks are awarded for correct answers and no marks are deducted from numerical type questions.

From 2013 to 2016, the marks obtained in the class XII school board examination used to be accorded a 40% weightage in deciding the JEE-Main all India ranks.

JEE-Advanced

JEE-Advanced is conducted for entry into 23 IIT's and some other equally prestigious universities like IISC Bangalore, IIST Thiruvananthapuram, Indian Institute of Petroleum and Energy (IIPE), Indian Institute of Science Education and Research (IISERs), Rajiv Gandhi Institute of Petroleum Technology (RGIPT). This exam is conducted by any one of the IIT's every year. In 2020, the exam was conducted by IIT Delhi. In 2021, 2022, and 2023, it shall be conducted by IIT Kharagpur, IIT Bombay and IIT Guwahati respectively. More than 2 lakh students become eligible to write JEE-Advanced every year. The top 250,000 students of JEE Main qualify to appear for the JEE-Advanced examination. In 2018, 224,000 students were appeared to take the JEE-Advanced, a number that had gone up from 220,000 in 2017 and 200,000 in 2016.

History
The JEE pattern has undergone many changes. Since 2012 candidates are given paper copies of their answers, and cutoffs are announced. This transparency was achieved after a tenacious legal tussle waged by IIT Kharagpur professor Rajeev Kumar, who was nominated for the National RTI Award 2010 for his crusade. Since 2013–14, JEE has changed a lot and recently adopted new online admissions and application selection procedures which were not available in recent years.

In 2012, the government-run Central Board of Secondary Education (CBSE) that earlier conducted the AIEEE, announced the JEE that replaced the AIEEE and IIT-JEE. The JEE-Main, which replaces AIEEE, is for admission to the National Institutes of Technology (NITs), Indian Institutes of Information Technology (IIITs), and some other colleges designated as "centrally funded technical institutes" (CFTIs). The JEE-Advanced, which replaces IIT-JEE, is only for admission to the Indian Institutes of Technology (IITs). Only the students selected in JEE-Main are eligible for appearing in JEE-Advanced. About 224,000 students will be selected from 2018.

In September 2013, the IIT Council approved the decision of the Joint Admission Board to continue with the two-phase JEE pattern ("Main" followed by "Advanced") for IITs in 2014. Followed by the exams, JoSAA conducts the joint admission process for a total of 23 IITs, 31 NITs, 25 IIITs and other Government Funded Technical Institutes (GFTIs).

See also 
 Graduate Aptitude Test in Engineering (GATE)
 SAT Reasoning Test
 ACT (test)

References

External links 
 JEE-Main official website
 JEE-Advanced official website
 JOSAA official website

Engineering entrance examinations in India